Callerya is a genus of flowering plants in the legume family, Fabaceae. It belongs to the subfamily Faboideae, tribe Wisterieae. The genus has a somewhat complicated taxonomic history; its circumscription was substantially revised in 2019.

Description
The leaves are evergreen and generally have 2–12 paired leaflets plus a terminal leaflet. The terminal leaflet is distinctly larger than the rest, and the basal pair usually smallest. Nine of the stamens are fused together, the other is free; all curve upwards at the apex.

Taxonomy

The taxonomic history of the genus Callerya and its type species is somewhat complicated. In 1843, Theodor Vogel published the genus name Marquartia for a species in the family Fabaceae that he called Marquartia tomentosa. However, Justus Carl Hasskarl had published the name Marquartia in the previous year (1842) for a genus in the family Pandanaceae, so Vogel's Marquartia was an illegitimate later homonym. Callerya was published by Stephan Endlicher  later in 1843, so became a replacement name for Vogel's Marquartia. The genus name commemorates Joseph-Marie Callery, a scholar, missionary and sinologist. The correct name for Vogel's Marquartia tomentosa apparently became Callerya tomentosa. However, it was later discovered that this species had already been described in 1842 by George Bentham as Millettia nitida, so the correct name in Callerya for the type species is Callerya nitida, a combination published by Robert Geesink in 1984.

The boundaries of Callerya have varied. Revisions by Geesink in 1984 and by Anne M. Schot in 1994 resulted in the genus being expanded, which continued until 33 species were recognised by 2016. Schot placed the genus in the tribe Millettieae. A 2019 molecular phylogenetic study showed that as then circumscribed, Callerya was not monophyletic, nor did it belong in Millettieae. Instead a reduced genus was placed in an expanded tribe Wisterieae, where it formed a clade with Afgekia, Kanburia, Serawaia and Whitfordiodendron, as sister to the other genera. Callerya flowers have wing petals that are shorter than the keel petals and standards that are relatively larger than in some related genera.

Species
Only five species were placed in the genus in the 2019 study. Other species which appeared to be in Callerya were not included in the study, so the exact boundaries of the revised genus were not settled. It was suggested that there might be "as many as twelve species". , Plants of the World Online accepted 13 species:

Former species
Three species formerly placed in the genus have been moved to Austrocallerya:
Callerya australis → Austrocallerya australis 
Callerya megasperma → Austrocallerya megasperma 
Callerya pilipes → Austrocallerya pilipes 

The genera Adinobotrys, Padbruggea and Whitfordiodendron, which had been sunk into Callerya, were restored in the 2019 study. Adinobotrys is not placed in the Wisterieae, the other two are. Species affected include:
Callerya atropurpurea → Adinobotrys atropurpureus
Callerya dasyphylla → Padbruggea dasyphylla
Callerya eriantha → Whitfordiodendron erianthum
Callerya nieuwenhuisii → Whitfordiodendron nieuwenhuisii
Callerya scandens → Whitfordiodendron scandens
Callerya sumatrana → Whitfordiodendron sumatranum

Distribution
Callerya species are native over a wide area from Nepal in the west through China to Hainan in the east and south through Indochina to Peninsular Malaysia.

References 

Wisterieae
Fabaceae genera